The 1962 Maharashtra State Assembly election was held for the second term of the Maharashtra Vidhan Sabha.  A total of 264 seats were contested. The Indian National Congress won 215 of the 264 seats.

List of participating political parties

Results

Party results 

|- align=center
!style="background-color:#E9E9E9" class="unsortable"|
!style="background-color:#E9E9E9" align=center|Political Party
!style="background-color:#E9E9E9" |No. of candidates
!style="background-color:#E9E9E9" |No. of elected
!style="background-color:#E9E9E9" |Seat change
!style="background-color:#E9E9E9" |Number of Votes
!style="background-color:#E9E9E9" |% of Votes
!style="background-color:#E9E9E9" |Change in vote %
|-
| 
|align="left"|Indian National Congress
|264
|215
| 80
|5,617,347
|51.22%
| 2.56%
|-
| 
|align="left"|Peasants and Workers Party of India
|79
|15
| 16
|818,801
|7.47%
| 0.81%
|-
| 
|align="left"|Praja Socialist Party
|101
|9
| 24
|792,755
|7.23%
| 1.74%
|-
| 
|align="left"|Communist Party of India
|56
|6
| 7
|647,390
|5.90%
| 2.27%
|-
| 
|align="left"|Republican Party of India
|66
|3
| 10 (from SCF seats)
|589,653
|5.38%
| 0.85% (from SCF vote share)
|-
| 
|align="left"|Socialist Party
|14
|1
| 1
|54,764
|0.50%
| 0.50% (New Party)
|-
| 
|align="left"| Akhil Bharatiya Jana Sangh
| 127
| 0
|  4
| 548,097
| 5.00%
|  3.44%
|-
| 
| 9
| 0
| (New Party)
| 48,484
| 0.44%
|  0.44% (New Party)
|-
| 
|5
|0
|1
|12,109
|0.11%
| 0.32%
|-
| 
|align="left"|Independents
|437
|15
| 19
|1,836,095
|16.74%
| 7.03%
|- style="background-color:#E9E9E9"
|
|align="left"|Total||1161||264||||10,966,279||60.36%|| 7.20%
|-
|}

Elected members

References

1962
1960s in Maharashtra
Maharashtra